Cosman is a surname. Notable people with the surname include:

Douglas I. Cosman (born 1938), Canadian politician and businessman
Felicia Cosman, American osteoporosis specialist
Francene Cosman (born 1941), Canadian politician
Jim Cosman (1943–2013), American baseball player
Madeleine Cosman (1937–2006), American academic, writer and activist
Milein Cosman (1921–2017), German-born British artist
Pamela Cosman, American computer and electrical engineer
Vadim Cosman (born 1997), Data analyst at Volvo Group